Vantage Point is the fifth studio album by Belgian rock band Deus, released in Europe on 18 April 2008, in the United Kingdom and Ireland on 21 April, and in Japan on 21 May. This is the first Deus album which features the same line-up as the previous album.
This album was also the first to be recorded at their own built studio in Borgerhout, near Antwerp.

Within its first week of release, Vantage Point was certified Gold by the Belgian Entertainment Association (BEA), before reaching Platinum status the following month.

Track listing

Personnel
Strings arranged by Klaas Janzoons
Artwork by Michaël Borremans
Artwork design by Rob Crane
Lyrics by Tom Barman
Mastered by Howie Weinberg
Mixed by, engineer - Joe Hirst
Music by Mauro Pawlowski (tracks: 3, 7), Barman (tracks: 3, 4, 7 to 10), Deus (tracks: 1, 2, 5, 6)
Producer, mixed by Dave McCracken
Recorded (additional recording), programmed by CJ Bolland, Catherine Marks, Euan Dickinson

Charts

Weekly charts

Year-end charts

Certifications

Singles

References

2008 albums
Deus (band) albums
V2 Records albums